Trudovye Rezervy Stadium is a multi-use stadium in Kursk, Russia. It seats 11,329 people.

References 

Football venues in Russia
Sport in Kursk
Buildings and structures in Kursk
FC Avangard Kursk